The 2017 International Champions Cup (or ICC) was the fifth edition of a series of friendly association football matches, organized to simulate a tournament. It began on 18 July and ended on 30 July 2017.

Teams

Matches

China

Singapore

United States

Tables

China

Singapore

United States

References

External links
 

2017
2017 in American soccer
2017 in Chinese football
2017 in Singaporean football
July 2017 sports events in Asia
July 2017 sports events in the United States